Iris Akahoshi (March 14, 1929, Czechoslovakia – July 24, 1987, U.S.) was an American human rights activist who became known for her persistent support of a jailed Ukrainian political prisoner.

Biography 
Akahoshi was born in Czechoslovakia to German parents. Her family moved to the United States when she was a young child and she grew up in Hollywood, California.

Akahoshi was an engineer by training but soon moved on to other interests. As she once wrote, “I simply cannot commit myself to one thing for any great length of time, and consequently I can never really become an expert at anything, though I came close to it in the engineering field. (I remained in it for seven years and was considered one of the better persons in my trade.)

Correspondent 
In 1976, through her involvement with Amnesty International's Group 11 based in New York city, Akahoshi began writing letters of support to the oppressed Ukrainian political prisoner Zenoviy Krasivsky (1929-1991) (sometimes spelled Zenovij Krasivskyj), who was a "renowned Ukrainian poet, human rights activist, and defender of Ukraine’s right to independence." She had no knowledge of Slavic languages. (Persistent letter writing to jailed dissidents has been a successful strategy long favored by the human rights organization Amnesty International.)

In 1976, Akahoshi wrote the first of many letters to Krasivsky when he was forcibly detained in a psychiatric hospital (Serbsky Institute, a "notorious Soviet psychiatric prison for dissidents"), but she did not receive a reply to any of them until he had received the 31st, after he had been temporarily freed and was able to answer. When his reply in Ukrainian was finally received, it said, "Dear Iris: In front of me are thirty one of your letters. This is my reply to the first one. The responses to the rest will follow...."

During the following years of persecution, he was taken to labor camps and then into Siberian exile. Despite his imprisonments, the "poignant correspondence" between the two continued and they became close friends, even though they were never able to meet and spoke over the telephone only once. (The letters were translated by fellow AI Group 11 member Anna Procyk.)

Their correspondence reveals Akahoshi's deep spirituality and overarching love of nature as well as Krasivsky's poetry and musings. Together, the writings been called "one of the most touching human documents of the cruel age." Their letters would outlive both of them; ultimately the collection was published in book form by Amnesty International.

According to Krasivsky, in a letter to her husband after her death,“Iris has come to me at a moment when I was at the lowest point of my existence--when it appeared that there were no windows or doors of escape from my condition….I had no doubt that she was sent to me by Providence as a ray of hope, as a bar of salvation for a drowning man….I resurrected and Iris became for me a bright star that did not cease to glow for many years to come. I have not known anyone who would embody so fully the best humanistic ideals as did Iris. Time may bring about change, but the idea of hope, the consciousness of something permanent and firm would never leave you because of Iris. She was like the light within you. Blessed be her name.” 
The relationship was not one-sided as attested by Akahoshi's friends. After she died, her friends wrote to Krasivsky saying,"his correspondence 'opened a new world for her. This is probably was one of the most important aspects of her life for the last 10 years.'"

Legacy 

 In 2013, many years of correspondence was translated and edited by Anna Procyk and published by Smoloskyp Publishers. Both Akahoshi and Krasivsky are credited as co-authors of the book. A review of the book by Alexander Motyl in The Ukrainian Weekly, May 18, 2014 says, "Readers of this moving and informative volume will have the privilege of sharing in the lives of an American activist and a Ukrainian dissident, both of whom wanted to live their lives ethically and make a difference – and succeeded on both counts."
 The image of Akahoshi appears in the play UBN of the Lviv Ukrainian Academic Theater named after M. Zankovetska (2000, directed by G. Telnyuk).

References

External sources 

 “Two Worlds, One Idea: Ten Years of Correspondence between Amnesty International Group 11 and a Ukrainian Political Prisoner, Zinovii Krasivskyj.” Anna Procyk, editor and translator. New York and Kyiv: Smoloskyp, 2013. ISBN 978- 966-1676-54-0. 418 pages.
The echo of two over the unknown: Correspondence of Ukrainian political prisoner Zinoviy Krasivsky with Amnesty International member Iris Akagoshi / Uporyad. and approx. L. Marinovich and M. Marinovich; Hood. shape. I. Gavrilyuk. - Kharkiv: JV “INART”, 1995. - 160 p.
 
International biographical dictionary of dissidents of Central and Eastern Europe and the former USSR. Vol. 1. Ukraine. Part 1. - Kharkiv: Kharkiv Human Rights Group; Human Rights, 2006. - P. 27. http://archive.khpg.org/index.php?id=1162910507
Amnesty International Group 11, NYC website.

1929 births
1987 deaths
American human rights activists
American political activists
Imprisonment and detention
Amnesty International people
Writers about activism and social change
Women human rights activists
20th-century American women writers
Czechoslovak emigrants to the United States